The 2023 Hardline Quebec Tankard, the Quebec men's provincial curling championship, was held from January 10 to 15 at the Centre Sportif Mistouk d'Alma in Alma, Quebec. The event was held in conjunction with the 2023 Quebec Scotties Tournament of Hearts, Quebec's provincial women's curling championship.

The winning Félix Asselin rink represented Quebec at the 2023 Tim Hortons Brier, in London, Ontario where they finished fourth in Pool B with a 5–3 record missing the Championship round by one game.

The event has not been held since 2020 due to the COVID-19 pandemic in Quebec. The 2022 event was cancelled at the last minute.

Teams
The teams are listed as follows:

Knockout brackets

Source:

A event

B event

C event

Knockout results
All draw times are listed in Eastern Time (UTC-05:00).

Draw 1
Tuesday, January 10, 9:30 am

Draw 2
Tuesday, January 10, 2:00 pm

Draw 3
Wednesday, January 11, 8:30 am

Draw 4
Wednesday, January 11, 12:15 pm

Draw 5
Wednesday, January 11, 4:00 pm

Draw 6
Wednesday, January 11, 8:00 pm

Draw 7
Thursday, January 12, 8:30 am

Draw 8
Thursday, January 12, 12:15 pm

Draw 9
Thursday, January 12, 4:00 pm

Draw 10
Friday, January 13, 8:30 am

Draw 11
Friday, January 13, 4:00 pm

Draw 12
Saturday, January 14, 9:00 am

Playoffs

A vs. B
Saturday, January 14, 2:00 pm

C1 vs. C2
Saturday, January 14, 2:00 pm

Semifinal
Sunday, January 15, 10:00 am

Final
Sunday, January 15, 2:00 pm

References

Quebec Men's Provincial Curling Championship
Curling competitions in Quebec
Quebec Men's Provincial
January 2023 sports events in Canada
Alma, Quebec